José Maria Soares Bento (born January 1957) is a Portuguese entrepreneur and a director of Richess Group, one of the possible bidders for British retail chain British Home Stores. Bento previously worked for the London-based corporate finance firm Anglo European Corporate Finance.

References

1957 births
Portuguese businesspeople
Living people